David Pearl may refer to:

 David Pearl (businessman) (born 1945), British property developer
 David Pearl (lawyer) (born 1944), British lawyer and member of the Judicial Appointments Commission
 David Pearl (performer) (born 1960), British singer, author, director and public speaker